Bad Day for Trains is the second studio album by Canadian country music singer-songwriter Patricia Conroy, and was released in 1992 by Warner Music Canada. The album was named Album of the Year by the Canadian Country Music Association in 1993.

Track listing

 "Bad Day for Trains" (Patricia Conroy, Ralph Murphy) – 3:44
 "My Baby Loves Me (Just the Way That I Am)" (Gretchen Peters) – 2:40
 "What Do You Care" (Bob Funk, Bruce Miller) – 4:01
 "Blank Pages" (Conroy) – 3:17
 "Still Life with a Heartache" (Sam Hogin, Peters) – 3:35
 "Talkin' to a Stranger" (Rodney Crowell, Keith Sykes) – 2:37
 "Keep Me from Blowin' Away" (Paul Craft) – 3:06
 "Johnny's Too Smart" (Conroy) – 3:18
 "Here We Go Again" (Jim Foster) – 2:34
 "Cat and Mouse" (Conroy) – 3:44

Chart performance

References

Patricia Conroy albums
1992 albums
Canadian Country Music Association Album of the Year albums